The FIFA World Cup is an international association football competition contested by the senior men's national teams of the Fédération Internationale de Football Association (FIFA), the sport's global governing body. The championship has been awarded every four years since 1930, except in 1942 and 1946, when it was not held because of World War II.

The World Cup final match is the last of the competition, played by the only two teams remaining in contention, and the result determines which country is declared the world champion. It is a one-off match decided in regulation time. In case of a draw, extra time is used. If scores are then still level, a penalty shoot-out determines the winner, under the rules in force since 1986; prior to that, finals still tied after extra time would have been replayed, though this never proved necessary. The golden goal rule would have applied during extra time in 1998 and 2002, but was not put in practice either.

The only exception to this type of format was the 1950 World Cup, which featured a final round-robin group of four teams; the decisive match of that group is often regarded as the de facto final of that tournament, including by FIFA itself.

The team that wins the final receives the FIFA World Cup Trophy, and its name is engraved on the bottom side of the trophy. Of 80 different nations that have appeared in the tournament, 13 have made it to the final, and 8 have won. Brazil, the only team that has participated in every World Cup, is also the most successful team in the competition, having won five titles and finished second twice. Italy and Germany have four titles each, with Germany having reached more finals than any other team, eight. Current champion Argentina has three titles, Uruguay and France have two each, while England and Spain have one each. Czechoslovakia, Hungary, Sweden, the Netherlands and Croatia have played in the final without winning. Only teams from Europe (UEFA) and South America (CONMEBOL) have ever competed in the final.

Argentina defeated France on penalties in the latest final, staged at Qatar's Lusail Stadium in 2022.

List of final matches

Results

See also
 List of FIFA Confederations Cup finals
 List of FIFA Women's World Cup finals
 List of UEFA European Championship finals
 List of FIFA World Cup final goalscorers

Footnotes

References
General

Specific

External links
FIFA World Cup™ at FIFA.com

 
Finals
 
finals